Typhinellus labiatus is a species of sea snail, a marine gastropod mollusk in the family Muricidae, the murex snails or rock snails.

Description
The length of the shell attains 21 mm.

Distribution
This species occurs in the Mediterranean Sea.

References

 Nordsieck, F. (1972). Marine Gastropoden aus der Shiqmona-Bucht in Israël. Archiv für Molluskenkunde. 102 (4-6): 227-245
 Ceulemans, L.; van Dingenen, F.; Merle, D.; Landau, B. M. (2016). The lower Pliocene gastropods of Le Pigeon Blanc (Loire-Atlantique, northwest France). Part 3. – Muricidae. Vita Malacologica. 15: 35-55.
 Landau B.M., Merle D., Ceulemans L. & Van Dingenen F. (2019). The upper Miocene gastropods of northwestern France, 3. Muricidae. Cainozoic Research. 19(1): 3-44.
 Houart, R, Buge, B. & Zuccon, D. (2021). A taxonomic update of the Typhinae (Gastropoda: Muricidae) with a review of New Caledonia species and the description of new species from New Caledonia, the South China Sea and Western Australia. Journal of Conchology. 44(2): 103–147.

External links
 De Cristofori, G.; Jan, G. (1832). Catalogus in IV sectiones divisus rerum naturalium in Museo exstantium Josephi de Cristofori et Georgii Jan plurium acad. scient. et societ. Nat. cur. sodalium complectens adumbatrionem oryctognosiae et geognosiae atque prodromus Faunae et Florae Italiae superioris. Sectio II. Conchyliologia. Pars 1a. Conspectus methodicus molluscorum. Fasc. 1us. Testacea terrestria et fluviatilia. [Includes: Dispositio methodica generum quibus Mollusca terrestria et fluviatilia in collectione nostra addicuntur, 2 pp.; Conchylia terrestria et fluviatilia in collectione nostra exstantia cum aliis ea deficientibus commutanda atque argento aequiparanda, 8 pp.; Mantissa in secundam partem catalogi testaceorum exstantium in collectione quam possident De-Cristofori et Jan, exhibens Characteres essentiales specierum Molluscorum terrestrium et fluviatilium ab eis enunciatarum in prima parte ejusdem Catalogi, 4 pp.; Excerptum e primo nostro programmate (Calendis Novembris, 1831), p. 1.; Excerptum e secundo nostro programmate (12° Calendas Aprilis 1832), 1 p.; Excerptum e secundo nostro programmate (21° Martii 1832). Sectio Secunda. Conchyliologia, 2 pp; Conchylia fossilia ex formatione telluris tertiaria in collectione nostra exstantia, 16 pp. Milano (Pirotta).
 Risso, A. (1826-1827). Histoire naturelle des principales productions de l'Europe Méridionale et particulièrement de celles des environs de Nice et des Alpes Maritimes. Paris, F.G. Levrault. 3(XVI): 1-480, 14 pls.
 Bellardi L. & Michelotti G. (1840). Saggio orittographico sulla classe dei gasteropodi fossili dei terreni terziarii del Piemonte. 82 pp., 8 pls. Also published in 1841 as: Memorie della Reale Accademia delle Scienze di Torino, ser. 2, 3: 93-174, pls 2-9. 
 Bronn, H. G. (1834-1838). Lethaea geognostica oder Abbildungen und Beschreibungen der für die Gebirgs-Formationen bezeichnendsten Versteinerungen. Vol. 1, pp. 1-544 (pp. 1-96

Typhinellus
Gastropods described in 1832